The Codex Palatinus, designated by e or 2 (in Beuron system), is a 5th-century Latin Gospel Book. The text, written on purple dyed vellum in gold and silver ink (as are codices a b f i j), is a version of the old Latin.  Most of the manuscript was in the Austrian National Library at Vienna (Cod. 1185) until 1919, when it was transferred to Trento, where it is now being kept as Ms 1589 in the Library of Buonconsiglio Castle. Two leaves were separated from the manuscript in the 18th century: one is now in the library of Trinity College, Dublin (MS 1709), the other in the British Library (Add. MS 40107) in London (Digital images).

Description 
The manuscript contains the text of the four Gospels. The Gospels follow in the Western order.

It has numerous lacunae.

The Latin text of the codex is basically African recension, but it has been strongly Europeanized.

In John 1:34 it reflects ὁ ἐκλεκτός along with the manuscripts 𝔓5, 𝔓106, א, b, ff2, syrc, syrs.

History 
The manuscript was acquired from Trent between 1800 and 1829. It was edited by Constantin von Tischendorf (Evangelicum Palatinum ineditum, Leipzig 1847), Johannes Belsheim, and Jülicher.

See also 

 List of New Testament Latin manuscripts
 Purple parchment

References

Further reading 

 J. Belsheim, Evangelium palatinum: reliqvias IV Evangeliorum ante Hieronymum latine translatorum, 1896.
 A. Jülicher, Itala. Das Neue Testament in Altlateinischer Überlieferung, Walter de Gruyter, Berlin, New York, 1976. (Marcus Evangelium)
 E. A. Lowe, On the African Origin of Codex Palatinus of the Gospels (e), The Journal of Theological Studies 1922 os-XXIII(92):401-404.

Purple parchment
Gospel Books
Vetus Latina New Testament manuscripts
5th-century biblical manuscripts
British Library additional manuscripts
5th-century illuminated manuscripts